Virlana Tkacz (born June 23, 1952, in Newark, New Jersey) is the founding director of the Yara Arts Group, a resident company at the world-renowned La MaMa Experimental Theatre Club in New York. She was educated at Bennington College and Columbia University, where she earned a Master of Fine Arts in theatre directing.

With Yara she created almost forty original theatre pieces that fuse fragments of contemporary poetry and traditional songs, chants, legends and history from East to create an imagistic production with a narrative. Experimental in their form and essence, they employ video, projected images, and complex musical scores to explore our relationship to time and consciousness. Recent Yara pieces include "1917-2017: Tychyna Zhadan & the Dogs" was about the violence of war and received two New York Innovative Theatre Awards.  Currently she is working on "Radio 477!" about Kharkiv, Ukraine, based on a jazz score from Kharkiv in 1929.

Theatre productions 

Ms. Tkacz has created over twenty-five original theatre pieces that were collaborations with experimental theatre companies from Eastern Europe. These pieces were performed at La MaMa in New York, in major theatres in Kyiv, Kharkiv and Lviv and at international theatre festivals, as well as in village cultural centers.  Yara's recent piece Dark Night, Bright Stars, was about the meeting of Ukrainian poet Taras Shevchenko and African America tragedian Ira Aldridge, which NY Theatre Wire called "visually striking," writing: "On the surface level, this play is a story about two friends with similar pasts having a cultural exchange, but dig deeper and you discover themes of race and poverty, oppression and liberation, diaspora and the yearning for home." "Opera GAZ" she created with Nova Opera from Kyiv performed at La MaMa in New York in December 2019 and was called “brilliant,” “one of the most searing modern operas” and “a must see.” 

In 1996 she began working with indigenous Buryat artists from Siberia. Together they created six original theatre pieces. Based on traditional material, rituals and shaman chants these pieces were performed at La MaMa, in Ulan Ude at the Buryat National Theatre, and in the villages of Aga-Buryat Region, These include Circle, which entered the repertoire of the Buryat National Theatre and recently after its 330 performance became the company's most performed show. The Village Voice wrote: “A stunningly beautiful work, Circle, rushes at your senses, makes your heart pound, and shakes your feeling loose.”

In 2005 Ms. Tkacz worked on a translation of Janyl Myrza, a 17th-century Kyrgyz epic about a woman warrior. After traveling to the Celestial Mountains, she created Janyl, with artists from Yara and the Sakhna Nomadic Theatre of Kyrgyzstan. The show performed at La MaMa in 2007, the capital of Bishkek, the regional center of Naryn and in the Celestial Mountains, where Janyl's story took place. Photographs from Janyl are featured in Kyrgyz Epic Theatre in New York: Photographs by Margaret Morton published by the University of Central Asia in 2008. In 2008 Virlana created Er Toshtuk based on one of the oldest Kyrgyz epics about a magical and darkly humorous journey into the underworld. Ihe show performed at La MaMa in 2009 and continues to perform in Kyrgyzstan. Backstage called it "a small gem," “full of humor and terrific physicality.”

In addition to her work with Yara, Ms. Tkacz directed Return of the Native for BAM's Next Wave Festival with composer Peter Gordon and video artist Kit Fitzgerald. The piece performed at the Tucano Arts Festival in Rio de Janeiro and at Het Muziektheatre in Amsterdam. She also worked with them on Blue Lights in the Basement, the memorial to Marvin Gaye at the BAM Opera House. At the Aaron Davis Hall she staged Sekou Sundiata's Mystery of Love, ETC. She worked with David Roussève on Mana Goes to the Moon, and also directed plays for the Native American Ensemble, The Women's Project and in Coney Island.

Ms. Tkacz was a Fulbright Senior Scholar at the Theatre Institutes in Kyiv in 2002 and in Bishkek in 2008, as well as at the Kurbas theatre Center in Kyiv (2016). She has conducted theatre workshops for Harvard Summer Institute for eleven years and has lectured at Yale School of Drama and Tisch School of the Arts at NYU. She has assisted such directors as Andrei Serban, Ping Chong, George Ferencz and Wilford Leach at La MaMa, as well as Sir Peter Hall on Broadway and Michael Bogdanov at the National Theatre in London.

Books and translations 

Since 1989 she has worked with African-American poet Wanda Phipps on translations of Ukrainian poetry. Their work has formed the core of many Yara theatre pieces and appeared in numerous American literary journals, anthologies and on CD inserts. Their translations used in Yara productions were published in 2008 as a bilingual anthology In a Different Light. Together they have received the Agni Translation Prize, seven NYSCA translation grants and The National Theatre Translation Fund Award for their work on the verse drama Forest Song. Tkacz and Phipps have also devoted themselves to translating traditional material including: folk tales, songs, incantations and epics. In 2005 Tkacz was awarded the NEA Poetry Translation Fellowship for work on the contemporary poetry of Serhiy Zhadan. Yale University Press published What We Life For/What We Die For: Selected Poems by Serhiy Zhadan in their translations. The reviewer for Times Literary Supplement called Zhadan “a world-class poet” and their translations “masterful.” The book was nominated for a PEN Poetry Translation Award.

Yara's work with Buryat artists led Tkacz and Phipps to collaborate with Sayan Zhambalov on Buryat Mongolian translations. Their work on shaman chants was recognized by the Witter Bynner Foundation for Poetry Translation Award and led to the publication of their book Shanar: Dedication Ritual of a Buryat Shaman by Parabola Books in 2002. The book was published in paperback as Siberian Shamanism: The Shanar Ritual of the Buryats in 2015 and in French as Chamanisme Siberien: Le Rituel du Shanr des Bouriates" in 2017.

Tkacz has published articles in Theatre History Studies, Journal of Ukrainian Studies, Canadian Slavonic Papers, and Canadian-American Slavic Studies and has written about her own work in American Theatre. In 2010 she co-edited with Irena Makaryk Modernism in Kyiv: Jubilant Experimentation, a monumental book on the arts of Kyiv in the 1920s published by University of Toronto Press in 2010. Uilliam Blacker reviewed the book recently for Harvard Ukrainian Studies and wrote: "Irena Makaryk and Virlana Tkacz’s volume on the dynamic cultural life of Kyiv in the age of modernism represents a momentous achievement in English-language scholarship on Ukrainian culture. The volume recovers the neglected but rich modernist culture of Ukraine for the English-speaking reader, but its significance is, by virtue of the scope and framing of the project, also wider than this: in its attention to transnational cultural dynamics and (neo)colonial frameworks and attitudes, the volume represents a corrective to the metropolitan orientation of scholarship on modernist culture."

In 2017 and 2018 together with Tetiana Rudenko and Waldemart Klyuzko, Virlana Tkacz co-curated a series of museum exhibitions on the work of theatre director Les Kurbas. These included: "Kurbas in Kyiv," February-October 2017 at the Museum of Theatre, Music and Cinema in Kyiv, "Kurbas in Kharkiv" at the Yermilov Center in Kharkiv and "Kurbas: New Worlds" at the Mystetsky Arsenal in Kyiv. The catalog for this exhibit is now available on-line 

In 2007 Virlana Tkacz was named “Honored Artist of Ukraine.” In 2021, the Virtual Forest Song during the Covid pandemic was performed online using Zoom technology to play with images of trees (oak, sycamore, birch and willow) merging with actors, music, and newsreel images of 'burnt and ruined' homes from the conflict zones in Eastern Ukraine.

 Productions Virlana Tkacz created with Yara Arts Group 
2021 A Thousand Suns2021 Virtual Forest Song 
2019 Opera GAZ2019 Winter Songs on Mars 
2018 Following the Milky Way  
2017 1917/2017: Tychyna, Zhandan and the Dogs 
2016 Dark Night, Bright Stars 
2015 Hitting Bedrock 
2014 Capt. John Smith Goes to Ukraine 
2014 Winter Light 
2014 Underground Dreams 
2013 Fire, Water, Night2013 Midwinter Night 
2012 Dream Bridge2011 Raven2010 Winter Sun2010 Scythian Stones2009 Er Toshtuk2008 Still the River Flows2007 Janyl2005 Koliada: Twelve Dishes2004 The Warrior's Sister2003 Swan2002 Howling2002 Kupala 
2001 Obo: Our Shamanism2000 Song Tree2000 Circle1998-99 Flight of the White Bird1996-1997 Virtual Souls1995 Waterfall/Reflections1994 Yara's Forest Song1993 Blind Sight 
1992 Explosions1990-91 A Light from the East/In the Light''
For more information on Yara Arts Group and photographs see Yara Arts Group

Books 
 "Kurbas: New Worlds", catalog of exhibit at Mysteskyi arsenal October 17 to December 2, 2018.
 What We Live For/What We Die For: Selected Poems, by Serhiy Zhadan, translated by Virlana Tkacz and Wanda Phipps, New Haven: Yale University Press, 2019.
 Modernism in Kyiv: Jubilant Experimentation, edited by Irena R. Makaryk and Virlana Tkacz, Toronto: University of Toronto Press, 2010.
 In a Different Light: A Bilingual Anthology of Ukrainian Literature Translated into English by Virlana Tkacz and Wanda Phipps as Performed by Yara Arts Group, edited by Olha Luchuk, Lviv: Sribne Slovo Press, 2008
 Kyrgyz Epic Theatre in New York: Photographs by Margaret Morton edited by Virlana Tkacz, Bishkek: University of Central Asia, 2008.
 Shanar: Dedication Ritual of a Buryat Shaman by Virlana Tkacz, with Sayan Zhambalov and Wanda Phipps, photographs by Alexander Khantaev, New York: Parabola Books, 2002.
 Ten Years of Poetry from the Yara Theatre Workshops at Harvard twenty of the best Ukrainian poems from the Yara Workshops in award-winning translations by Virlana Tkacz & Wanda Phipps. The hand-made book was designed by Carmen Pujols in 1998. Each book is numbered and signed by the person who assembled it.

References

External links
 Yara Arts Group

1952 births
Living people
American theatre directors
Women theatre directors
Bennington College alumni
Columbia University School of the Arts alumni
Harvard Summer School instructors
People from Newark, New Jersey